Mayashalik (Bengali: মায়াশালিক,) is a 2022 Bangladeshi sci-fi romantic web film directed by Shihab Shaheen. The film stars Ziaul Faruq Apurbo, Sadiya Ayman in lead roles and  Shahiduzzaman Selim, Imtiaz Barshon in supporting roles.

Plot
 
The story of "Mayashalik" revolves around a young, retired military officer, who had to leave the army due to physical injuries. To get rid of his depression, he moves away from the chaotic city life, to a place where there is no mobile network. That's when some mysterious activities begin to take place around him, and he eventually falls in love with a mysterious girl.

Cast
Ziaul Faruq Apurbo as Ovi
Sadia Ayman as Sara
Imtiaz Barshon as librarian
Shahiduzzaman Selim as Sara's father

Release
The film has been released digitally on Binge on 19 December 2022.

References

2022 films
2020s Bengali-language films
Bengali-language Bangladeshi films